Drosophila gracilipalpis is a species of fly in the subgenus Dudaica.

References 

gracilipalpis
Insects described in 2018